Moderation is the process of eliminating or lessening extremes.  It is used to ensure normality throughout the medium on which it is being conducted.  Common uses of moderation include:
Ensuring consistency and accuracy in the marking of student assessments.
A moderator may remove unsuitable contributions from the website, forum or chat room they represent in accordance with their moderation system.
A more proactive nuance is found in the Methodist church's use of the term for the heads of its conferences.
A neutron moderator is used to slow down neutrons in a nuclear reactor.
A way of life emphasizing perfect amounts of everything, not indulging in too much of one thing, hence moderation.

History

Ancient Greece 

Moderation is also a principle of life. In ancient Greece, the temple of Apollo at Delphi bore the inscription Meden Agan - 'Nothing in excess'. Doing something "in moderation" means not doing it excessively. For instance, someone who moderates their food consumption tries to eat all food groups, but limits their intake of those that may cause deleterious effects to harmless levels.

According to the historian and sociologist of science Steven Shapin:

Christianity 

Similarly, in Christianity, moderationism is the position that drinking alcoholic beverages temperately is permissible, though drunkenness is forbidden (see Christianity and alcohol).

In the Book of Wisdom moderation is listed among the greatest virtues.

Islam and Judaism

Wasat, also called wasatiyyah is the Arabic word for best, middle, centered, balanced. In the Islamic context, it refers to the "middle way" or "moderation", a justly balanced way of life, avoiding extremes and experiencing things in moderation. 
Moderate Muslims adhere to the concept of contextual relativism as a way to grasp meaning from the Quran.

The Jewish philosopher Maimonides, who was heavily influenced by Islamic and Aristotelian thought, also set forth moderation as an ideal within Judaism.

Taoism 

Moderation is considered a key part of one's personal development in Chinese Taoist philosophy and religion and is one of the three jewels of Taoist thought. There is nothing that cannot be moderated including one's actions, one's desires and even one's thoughts. It is believed that by doing so one achieves a more natural state, faces less resistance in life and recognises one's limits. Taken to the extreme, moderation is complex and can be difficult to not only accept, but also understand and implement. It can also be recursive in that one should moderate how much one moderates (i.e. to not be too worried about moderating everything or not to try too hard in finding a middle ground)

Moderation as a principle of Taoist philosophy turns up in all three of its main texts.

Others 

Moderation is a characteristic of the Swedish national psyche, more specifically described by the Swedish synonym Lagom. 

In an internet forum a moderator is one who enforces the rules.

See also

 Middle Way (Dhammacakkappavattana Sutta)
 Aparigraha
 Temperance
 Modesty

References

External links

Morality
Virtue